The Bomber Brigade was a World War II unit of the Polish Air Force commanded by płk obs. Władysław Heller. It resisted the Invasion of Poland in 1939 as the main aerial reserve of the commander in chief and was used for bombing enemy units in central Poland.  It was created just before the war and did not have time to reach full operational readiness. Its equipment consisted of 36 modern PZL.37 Łoś medium bombers, 50 older PZL.23 Karaś light bombers, as well as 21 support planes.  It was organised into four squadrons, each in turn composed of two escadrilles.  It was similar in make-up to the Pursuit Brigade.

 Polish 2nd Bomber Squadron (II Dywizjon Bombowy), commanded by mjr pil. Jan Biały
 Polish 21st Bomber Escadrille (21. Eskadra Bombowa), commanded by kpt. obs. Jan Buczma
 Polish 22nd Bomber Escadrille (22. Eskadra Bombowa), commanded by kpt. pil. Kazimierz Słowiński

 Polish 6th Bomber Squadron (VI Dywizjon Bombowy), commanded by mjr obs. Alfred Bartłomiej Peszke
 Polish 64th Bomber Escadrille (64. Eskadra Bombowa), commanded by kpt. pil. Mieczysław Pronaszko
 Polish 65th Bomber Escadrille (65. Eskadra Bombowa), commanded by kpt. pil. Maciej Piotrowski

 Polish 10th Bomber Squadron (X Dywizjon Bombowy), commanded by ppłk. pil. Józef Werakso
10th Bomber Squadron was previously called: "210 Dywizjon".
 Polish 211th Bomber Escadrille (211. Eskadra Bombowa), commanded by kpt. obs. Franciszek Omylak
 Polish 212th Bomber Escadrille (212. Eskadra Bombowa), commanded by kpt. pil. Stanisław Taras-Wołkowiński

 Polish 15th Bomber Squadron (XV Dywizjon Bombowy), commanded by kpt. pil. Stanisław Cwynar
15th Bomber Squadron was previously called: "215 Dywizjon".
 Polish 216th Bomber Escadrille (216. Eskadra Bombowa), commanded by kpt. obs. Władysław Dukszto
 Polish 217th Bomber Escadrille (217. Eskadra Bombowa), commanded by kpt. obs. Eugeniusz Prusiecki

Some reports mention another Bomber Squadron called:
 Polish 20th Bomber Squadron (XX Dywizjon Bombowy)
20th Bomber Squadron was previously called: "220 Dywizjon".

 Polish 55th Independent Bomber Escadrille (55. Samodzielna Eskadra Bombowa), commanded by kpt. obs. Józef Skibiński
 Liaison platoon No. 4 (Pluton łącznikowy nr 4)
 Liaison platoon No. 12 (Pluton łącznikowy nr 12)

Another small Bomber unit was the Flight based at Dęblin, the Polish Air Force Training Academy. During the Invasion of Poland, their unit flew many operations using PZL.23 Karaś light bombers. 

Air force brigades of Poland